Snorri is a masculine given name. People with the name include:

 Snorri Þorbrandsson, a character in the Icelandic Eyrbyggja saga
 Snorri Goði or Snorri Þorgrímsson (963–1031), a prominent chieftain in Western Iceland, featured in a number of Icelandic sagas
 Snorri Thorfinnsson (1004-1090), son of the explorer Þorfinnr Karlsefni and Guðríðr Eiríksdóttir
 Snorri Sturluson (1179–1241), an Icelandic historian, poet, and politician
 Snorri Hjartarson (1906–1986), an Icelandic poet and winner of the Nordic Council's Literature Prize
 Snorri Hergill Kristjánsson (born 1974), an Icelandic stand-up comedian based in London
 Snorri Snorrason (born 1977), an Icelandic singer who rose to popularity after winning the Icelandic version of Pop Idol
 Snorri Guðjónsson (born 1981), an Icelandic handball player

Icelandic masculine given names